DNA repair protein XRCC2 is a protein that in humans is encoded by the XRCC2 gene.

Function 

This gene encodes a member of the RecA/Rad51-related protein family that participates in homologous recombination to maintain chromosome stability and repair DNA damage. This gene is involved in the repair of DNA double-strand breaks by homologous recombination and it functionally complements Chinese hamster irs1, a repair-deficient mutant that exhibits hypersensitivity to a number of different DNA-damaging agents.

The XRCC2 protein is one of five human paralogs of RAD51, including RAD51B (RAD51L1), RAD51C (RAD51L2), RAD51D (RAD51L3), XRCC2 and XRCC3.  They each share about 25% amino acid sequence identity with RAD51 and each other.

The RAD51 paralogs are all required for efficient DNA double-strand break repair by homologous recombination and depletion of any paralog results in significant decreases in homologous recombination frequency.

XRCC2 forms a four-part complex with three related paralogs: BCDX2 (RAD51B-RAD51C-RAD51D-XRCC2) while two paralogs form a second complex CX3 (RAD51C-XRCC3). These two complexes act at two different stages of homologous recombinational DNA repair.  The BCDX2 complex is responsible for RAD51 recruitment or stabilization at damage sites.  The BCDX2 complex appears to act by facilitating the assembly or stability of the RAD51 nucleoprotein filament.

The CX3 complex acts downstream of RAD51 recruitment to damage sites.  The CX3 complex was shown to associate with Holliday junction resolvase activity, probably in a role of stabilizing gene conversion tracts.

Interactions 

XRCC2 has been shown to interact with RAD51L3, Bloom syndrome protein and RAD51C.

Epigenetic deficiency in cancer

There are two known epigenetic causes of XRCC2 deficiency that appear to increase cancer risk.  These are methylation  of the XRCC2 promoter and epigenetic repression of XRCC2 by over-expression of EZH2 protein.

The XRCC2 gene was found to be hypermethylated in the promoter region in 52 of 54 cases of cervical cancer.  Promoter hypermethylation reduces gene expression, and thus would reduce the tumor suppressing homologous recombinational repair otherwise supported by XRCC2.

Increased expression of EZH2 leads to epigenetic repression of RAD51 paralogs, including XRCC2, and thus reduces homologous recombinational repair.  This reduction was proposed to be a cause of breast cancer.  EZH2 is the catalytic subunit of Polycomb Repressor Complex 2 (PRC2) which catalyzes methylation of histone H3 at lysine 27 (H3K27me) and mediates gene silencing of target genes via local chromatin reorganization.  EZH2 protein is up-regulated in numerous cancers.  EZH2 mRNA is up-regulated, on average, 7.5-fold in breast cancer, and between 40% to 75% of breast cancers have over-expressed EZH2 protein.

References

Further reading